Georgie Glen is a Scottish actress, known for her film and television work in both dramatic and comedic roles. Among her most popular performances are the running characters of Miss Higgins in the BBC One period drama series Call The Midwife from 2018 onwards, and of history teacher Audrey McFall in the BBC One school-based drama series Waterloo Road from 2012 to 2015.

Life and career

Glen is from Helensburgh in Argyll and Bute, Scotland and graduated from Glasgow School of Art with a degree in graphic design. She worked at Thames and Hudson publishers as an assistant book designer for five years before studying at the Bristol Old Vic Theatre School for two years. After graduating she worked for a year at Wolsey Theatre in Ipswich, England.

She has featured in the BBC One drama series, Call the Midwife, Waterloo Road, Les Misérables, as Mother Abbess; in 2012, she had appeared in Les Misérables the film, as Madame Baptistine. Additional period performances include Hannah More in the 2006 film, Amazing Grace, John Ruskin's mother in the drama, Desperate Romantics about the Pre-Raphaelite Brotherhood, as well as lady-in-waiting to Judi Dench in both Shakespeare in Love and Mrs. Brown.

In 2018, she was cast in the role of Millicent Higgins, a GP receptionist, in Call the Midwife.

Other notable performances include a recurring role in Heartbeat, as Sgt Jennifer Noakes and one of the eponymous Calendar Girls. Glen has also portrayed various characters in comedies including Little Britain and Harry Enfield and Chums, as well as a guest role in The Thick of It.

She appeared in Series Four of Netflix drama, The Crown, in 2020 playing Ruth Roche, Lady Fermoy, the maternal Grandmother of Lady Diana Spencer and lady-in-waiting to the Queen Mother.

Personal life

She has twin daughters called Holly and Eleanor.

Filmography

Film
Blue Juice (1995) – Hotel receptionist
Mothertime (1997) – Sister Louise
Mrs. Brown (1997) – Lady Churchill
What Rats Won't Do (1998) – Woman with Dog
Shakespeare in Love (1998) – Lady in Waiting
The Little Vampire (2000) – Babysitter Lorna
Lucky Break (2001) – Audience Member
Calendar Girls (2003) – Kathy
Dating Ray Fenwick (2005, short) – Marjorie
Amazing Grace (2006) – Hannah More
Easy Virtue (2008) – Mrs. Landrigin
Hysteria (2011) – Mrs. Parsons
My Week with Marilyn (2011) – Rosamund Greenwood
Les Misérables (2012) – Madame Baptistine
Where Do We Go from Here? (2015) – Woman at Bar
Jackie (2016) – Rose Kennedy
The Hitman’s Bodyguard (2017) – ICC Lead Judge
Boyz in the Wood (2019) – The Duchess

Television
Soldier Soldier (1995) – Georgina Bennett
The Great Kandinsky (1995, TV film) – Vicar Shelley
The Bill (1995, 2006) – Sophie Mallin / Mrs. Willis
Doctor Finlay (1996) – Rosemary Bain
Take The High Road (1996) – Anita McTartt
No Bananas (1996) – Agnes Harding
As Time Goes By (1997) – Miss Wessel
Peak Practice (1997) – Myra Eburne
Mothertime (1997) – Sister Louise
Harry Enfield and Chums (1997–1998) – Tom's Mum / Potential Voter / Judith / Mother in Information Film
Jonathan Creek (1998) – Mrs Kilby
Berkeley Square (1998) – Lady Annabelle Wilton
Alas Smith & Jones (1998)
Children of the Forest (1998, TV film) – Phoebe
Tilly Trotter (1999) – Mabel Price
All Along the Watchtower (1999) – Mrs. Mulvey
Wives and Daughters (1999) – Miss Hornblower
The Railway Children (2000) – Aunt Emma
Hearts and Bones (2000) – Pamela
Brand Spanking New Show (2000) – June Bond in 'Rodney Bond' / Mrs Bridges in 'Pharmacist' / Caroline Smith MP in 'Paxman' / Mrs Hosier in 'Father Handsome'
Heartbeat (2000–2001, 2003–2005, 2009) – Sergeant Nokes
The Armando Iannucci Shows (2001) – Nun
Holby City (2001, 2007, 2010) – Anne Owen / Rosemary Greaves / Edie O'Connor
The American Embassy (2002) – Landlady
Daniel Deronda (2002) – Lady Mallinger
Dalziel and Pascoe (2002) – Headmistress
My Family (2003) – Mrs. Gleaves
Little Britain (2003–2005) – Agent's First Secretary / Samantha's Mother
Nighty Night (2004–2005) – Sister May / Bluebell
Doctors (2004, 2009) – Chrissie Franklin / Dorothy Bakewell
Doc Martin (2004, 2009) – Mrs. Willow / Barbara
Taggart (2005) – Mrs. Campbell
Sea of Souls (2005) – Consultant
The Thick of It (2005) – Susan Dorling
Rome (2005) – Poppea
Love Soup (2005) – Woman in Store
The Worst Week of My Life (2005) – Moira
Cutting It (2005) – Bryony McClair (series 4)
The Line of Beauty (2006) – Eileen
After You've Gone (2007) – Mrs Grierson
[[To the Manor Born#2007 Christmas special|To the Manor Born 2007 Christmas Special]] (2007) – Panel ChairmanAgatha Christie's Poirot - Mrs Forbes - “Cat Among The Pigeons”The Sarah Jane Adventures (2008) – Mrs. King - “The Temptation of Sarah Jane Smith” Part 1&2The Long Walk to Finchley (2008) – Miss HarrisWaterloo Road (2012–2015) – Audrey McFall (series regular, 68 episodes)Warren United (2014) – Warren's Mum (voice)Boomers (2014) – EmmaThe Evermoor Chronicles  (2014–2016) – Aunt BridgetHoff the Record (2015) – Miss DunwoodyA Time to Dance (2016, TV film)Damned (2016–2018) – DeniseMidsomer Murders (2017) – Mary Oswood - “Death by Persuasion”GameFace (2017)Death on the Tyne (2018, TV film) – HildaHetty Feather (2018–2020) – Lady GrenfordCall the Midwife (2018–present) – Miss Millicent HigginsLes Misérables (2019) – AbbessThe Victim (2019) – JudgeThe Crown (2020) – Ruth Roche, Baroness Fermoy (series 4)Behind Her Eyes (2021) – SueThe Cleaner (2021) – Mrs GathernoidInside No. 9 (2022) - DinahRidley'' (2022) – Dr. Wendy Newstone

References

External links

Year of birth missing (living people)
Living people
People from Helensburgh
Scottish stage actresses
Scottish television actresses
Scottish film actresses